The Price She Paid is a 1917 American silent drama film directed by Charles Giblyn and starring Clara Kimball Young, Louise Beaudet and Alan Hale. It was shot at Lewis J. Selznick's Fort Lee studios in New Jersey.

Cast
 Clara Kimball Young as Mildred Gower 
 Louise Beaudet as Mrs. Gower 
 Cecil Fletcher as Frank Gower 
 Charles Bowser as Presbury 
 Snitz Edwards as General Siddall 
 Alan Hale as Stanley Baird 
 David Powell as Donald Keith 
 Cesare Gravina as Moldini

References

Bibliography
 Donald W. McCaffrey & Christopher P. Jacobs. Guide to the Silent Years of American Cinema. Greenwood Publishing, 1999.

External links
 

1917 films
1917 drama films
1910s English-language films
American silent feature films
Silent American drama films
Films directed by Charles Giblyn
American black-and-white films
Selznick Pictures films
Films shot in Fort Lee, New Jersey
1910s American films